Baionetta was a  of the Regia Marina. She served in World War II from 1943 to 1945.

On 9 September 1943, a day after the Italian armistice, Baionetta transported King Victor Emmanuel III and General Pietro Badoglio, together with their respective entourages and general staff officers, from the small harbour town of Ortona and sailed south escorted by the Italian  light cruiser , arriving in Brindisi the next day.

References

External links
Baionetta under way.
Baionetta Marina Militare website

Gabbiano-class corvettes
World War II naval ships of Italy
1942 ships
Ships built in Venice